Dot2Dot was a demand responsive airport bus service and company operating in London, United Kingdom. It started operations on 1 November 2007, after National Express rebranded the Hotelink business it acquired in April 2007.

Dot2Dot operated a mixed fleet of Mercedes-Benz Sprinter and Volkswagen Crafter minibuses and carried passengers from London's Heathrow and Gatwick airports to any location in a defined area of Central London or Canary Wharf, and vice versa. The company promised to have no more than three stops between pick-up and drop-off. On 18 July 2008, Dot2Dot withdrew the service to Gatwick Airport though this was later re-instated.

National Express announced in late 2008 that not having turned a profit, Dot2Dot would close in early 2009 if no buyer was found. In January 2009, Dot2Dot was sold to Corot plc of Milton Keynes for £1. Operations ceased in November 2009.

See also
EasyBus
Edinburgh Shuttle, a similar operation in Edinburgh

References

External links

www.dot2.com

National Express companies
Transport companies established in 2007
2007 establishments in England
2009 disestablishments in England
Airport bus services
Former London bus operators